The Australian Open is an annual tennis tournament created in 1905 and played on outdoor hard courts at Melbourne Park in Melbourne, Australia.

The women's singles was first contested in 1922 along with the women's and mixed doubles competition as the last three events to be added. The Australian Open is played during two weeks mid-January, and has been chronologically the first of the four Grand Slam tournaments of the tennis season since 1987. The event was not held from 1940 to 1945 because of World War II, and 1986 because Tennis Australia wanted to move the tournament start from mid-December 1986 to mid-January 1987. Margaret Court holds the all-time record for singles titles at this tournament with 11; 7 in the Amateur Era and 4 in the Open Era. Serena Williams holds the Open Era record with 7 singles titles.

History
Perth, Brisbane, Adelaide, Sydney, and Melbourne, Australia have all held the event. The competition switched locations every year before it settled in 1972 at the Kooyong Stadium, moving to Flinders Park, now Melbourne Park, in 1988. Several calendar changes took place for the Australian Open, from January to December in 1972 to bypass the January-to-June International Lawn Tennis Federation (ITLF) ban of World Championship Tennis (WCT) players; from late to early December in 1977 to avoid the Christmas holidays, which resulted in having two Opens in the season; and back to January, when the planned December 1986 edition was moved to early 1987, leaving no Open for the 1986 season.

An all British and an all American final were contested in 1935 and 1979 respectively, but otherwise every other final contested until 1980 featured an Australian player.

The women's singles' rules have undergone several changes, since the first edition. This event has been contested in a knockout format, and all matches played at the best-of-three sets. Since 1922, all sets have been decided in the advantage format, with six games and two games difference. The lingering death best-of-twelve points tie-break was introduced in 1971, and used for the first two sets since then, except from 1980 to 1982, when the tie-break was also played in final sets.

The court surface changed once, from grass (1922–1987) to hard courts, since the move to Flinders Park in 1988. No tennis player has won this event on both grass and Rebound Ace; Serena Williams is the only player to win the tournament on two different surfaces, winning her first three titles on Rebound Ace and her last four on Plexicushion.

The champion receives a miniature replica of the Daphne Akhurst Memorial Cup, named after the five-time champion, which was first awarded to the champion in 1934. In 2010, the winner received prize money of A$2,100,000.

In the Australasian Championship, Margaret Molesworth (1922–1923) and Daphne Akhurst (1925–1926) co-hold the records for most wins and most consecutive wins.

In the Australian Championships, Margaret Court (1960–1966) holds the records for most titles with seven wins, and most consecutive titles with seven from (1960–1966).

In the Australian Open, Serena Williams (2003, 2005, 2007, 2009–2010, 2015, 2017) has the most victories, with seven. The record for most consecutive titles is three held by the following players: Margaret Court (1969–1971), Evonne Goolagong (1974–1976), Steffi Graf (1988–1990), Monica Seles (1991–1993), Martina Hingis (1997–1999).

Overall in the Championship's history, Margaret Court (1960–1973) holds the records for most titles with eleven wins, and most consecutive titles with seven from (1960–1966).

This event has been won in straight sets during the Open Era of tennis by the following players: Margaret Court in 1969, 1970 and 1973, Virginia Wade in 1972, Kerry Melville Reid in 1977 January, Evonne Goolagong in 1975, 1976 and 1977 December, Chris O'Neil in 1978, Barbara Jordan in 1979, Hana Mandlíková in 1980 and 1987, Martina Navratilova in 1983, Steffi Graf in 1988, 1989 and 1994, Monica Seles in 1992 and 1996, Mary Pierce in 1995, Martina Hingis in 1997, 1998 and 1999, Lindsay Davenport in 2000, Jennifer Capriati in 2001, Amélie Mauresmo in 2006, Maria Sharapova in 2008, Victoria Azarenka in 2012, Li Na in 2014 and Serena Williams in 2007, 2009, 2015 and 2017.

Finals

Australasian Championships

Australian Championships

Australian Open

Statistics

Multiple champions

Champions by country

See also

Australian Open other competitions
List of Australian Open men's singles champions
List of Australian Open men's doubles champions 
List of Australian Open women's doubles champions
List of Australian Open mixed doubles champions

Grand Slam women's singles
List of French Open women's singles champions
List of Wimbledon ladies' singles champions
List of US Open women's singles champions
List of Grand Slam women's singles champions

Notes

References
General

Specific

External links
Australian Open official website

Women
Australian Open